Nikole "Nikki" Barnes (born September 20, 1993) is an American sailor. She competed at the 2020 Summer Olympics, held July–August 2021 in Tokyo, in the Women's Two Person Dinghy - 470 event.

Personal life
Barnes was born in Saint Thomas, U.S. Virgin Islands and started sailing when she was six years old. She is a 2017 graduate of the United States Coast Guard Academy and is now an active-duty member, currently a lieutenant attached to Sector Miami. She is the first member of the Coast Guard to ever compete in the Olympic games.

Career highlights
3rd at the  2011 ISAF Youth Sailing World Championships in the i420
Quantum Women's Sailor of the Year award
2017 Sportsman of the Year award
3 All-American honors three times

References

External links
 Home - Perfect Vision Sailing - PVS

1993 births
Living people
American female sailors (sport)
American military Olympians
Female United States Coast Guard personnel
Olympic sailors of the United States
Sailors at the 2020 Summer Olympics – 470
United States Coast Guard Academy alumni
United States Coast Guard officers
21st-century American women